John James Pashley (31 August 1933 – 6 November 2015) was a rugby union player who represented Australia.

Pashley, a flanker, was born in Manly, New South Wales and claimed a total of 5 international rugby caps for Australia.

Pashley died on 6 November 2015, at the age of 82.

References

1933 births
2015 deaths
Australia international rugby union players
Australian rugby union players
Rugby union flankers
Rugby union players from Sydney